The 1926–27 NHL season was the tenth season of the National Hockey League. The success of the Boston Bruins and the Pittsburgh Pirates led the NHL to expand further within the United States. The league added three new teams: the Chicago Black Hawks, Detroit Cougars and New York Rangers, to make a total of ten, split in two divisions. This resulted in teams based in Canada being in the minority for the first time. To stock the teams with players the new teams brought in players from the Western Hockey League, which folded in May 1926. This left the NHL in sole possession of hockey's top players, as well as sole control of hockey's top trophy, the Stanley Cup, which was won by the Ottawa Senators. This was the original Senators' eleventh and final Stanley Cup win. The Senators' first was in 1903.

League business
At the 1926 Stanley Cup Final, WHL president Frank Patrick began shopping the WHL's players to the NHL, hoping to raise $300,000 to distribute to the WHL owners. Patrick approached Art Ross of the Bruins, who agreed to purchase the contracts of Frank Fredrickson, Eddie Shore and Duke Keats. After the series, Patrick approached the new New York Rangers owner Tex Hammond and their general manager Conn Smythe, but they were turned down. Patrick and Ross approached the Bruins' owner who agreed to purchase the entire lot of players for $250,000, and gave Patrick a $50,000 check as a deposit. He planned to keep some of the players for the Bruins, sell twelve players each to the new Chicago and Detroit franchises and distribute the rest to the rest of the league.

At the May 1, 1926, meeting, the NHL awarded the Detroit franchise to the syndicate of Wesley Seybourn and John Townsend, formed by Charles A. Hughes. However, a split occurred in the NHL over the awarding of the Chicago franchise. Tex Ricard wanted to build a new arena in Chicago, and backed the syndicate formed by Huntington Hardwick. This was blocked at first by the New York Rangers, as a new franchise required unanimity. But the NHL governors could amend their constitution with a two-thirds vote, and they amended the constitution to lower the bar for a new franchise to a simple majority vote. The governors agreed that Huntwick would get the Chicago franchise. Huntwick proceeded to buy the Portland Rosebuds and the Hughes group purchased the Victoria Cougars, each for $100,000. The Bruins took Fredrickson, Shore, Keats and others, while the Rangers took Frank Boucher. In total, the player's contracts purchased that day totalled $267,000 for Patrick to take back to the WHL. On May 15, the NHL awarded the franchises to the Hardwick and Hughes consortiums, with provisals that each team would have an NHL-ready team for September 1, and new arenas by November 10.

At the September 25, 1926, NHL meeting, the Chicago Black Hawks, Detroit Cougars and New York Rangers were added to the league. The Hughes consortium proceeded with the purchase of the Cougars and the franchise, while the Chicago franchise instead went to Frederic McLaughlin, who took over the deal from Huntwick on June 1. The NHL's second franchise in New York City went to the Madison Square Garden syndicate of John S. Hammond.

Toronto bought the players of the Saskatoon franchise separately, and Montreal claimed George Hainsworth. The rest of the WHL players would be distributed by a committee of Frank Calder, Leo Dandurand and James Strachan. The former WHL players make an impact in the NHL. The top scorer is Bill Cook, the top goalie is George Hainsworth, and defenceman Herb Gardiner is the league MVP.

A special meeting was held on October 26 at which the NHL was split into the Canadian and American divisions. It was the first divisional format to be implemented in a major professional North American sports league. To balance the divisions, the New York Americans were placed in the Canadian Division. With the new divisional alignment came an altered playoff format: the top team from each division would meet the winner of a total-goals series between the second and third place teams from their divisions. The winners of those total-goals series would meet in a best-of-five Stanley Cup final.

The Central Hockey League changed its name to the American Hockey Association. The new AHA signed an agreement of co-operation with the NHL, wanting to place itself on an equal footing with the NHL, but non-competitive. However, the new AHA placed franchises in Chicago and Detroit, competing with NHL teams. The Chicago Cardinals were backed by old nemesis Eddie Livingstone and became a source of friction with the NHL. Calder declared that several of the Cardinals' players were illegally signed and broke off the agreement with the AHA. The AHA could not compete with the NHL and the Detroit franchise folded in December, and the Chicago franchise folded in March. The AHA then signed another cooperation agreement with the NHL and forced Livingstone out.

The Toronto St. Patricks were sold in mid-season to a syndicate headed by Conn Smythe for $160,000. The club is renamed the Toronto Maple Leafs. However, the NHL ruled that the team had to use the name St. Patricks until the end of the 1926–27 season or the team's players would become free agents, as they were under contract as the St. Pats. They became the Maple Leafs the following season.

Rules changes
The blue lines moved to sixty feet from the goal line from twenty feet from the center red line to increase the size of the neutral zone.

Two innovations attributed to Art Ross are adopted by the NHL. The league adopts a modified puck, which has rounded edges. The net is modified to keep the puck in the webbing.

Regular season
The Montreal Canadiens, last place finishers in 1925–26, solved their goaltending woes by signing George Hainsworth. They further strengthened their team by signing Herb Gardiner of the Western League's Calgary Tigers for defence. The Canadiens finished second in the Canadian Division to powerful Ottawa, who was the league's best team.

Dave Gill, secretary-treasurer (general manager), decided to take over as coach of the Ottawa Senators. He would be assisted by Frank Shaughnessy, a former manager of the Senators in the NHA days, to assist him with the strategy used in games. Ottawa finished first atop the Canadian Division.

The arena is not ready in Detroit for the start of the regular season. The expansion Cougars play their first 22 home games just across the Canada–United States border in Windsor, Ontario, at the Border Cities Arena.

New York Americans right winger Shorty Green's career was ended after an injury in a game on February 27, 1927. New York Rangers defenceman Taffy Abel bodychecked Green, caused a kidney injury that requires an emergency operation to remove the kidney; Abel retired for health reasons.

Final standings
Note: W = Wins, L = Losses, T = Ties, Pts = Points, GF= Goals For, GA = Goals Against

Playoffs
With the collapse of the Western Hockey League, the Stanley Cup became the championship trophy of the NHL. The NHL teams now battled out amongst themselves for the coveted Cup. The new division alignment and the new playoff format also meant that an American team was guaranteed to be the first American NHL team to make the Cup Finals.

The division winners received a bye to the second round. The second-place and third-place finishers played a two-game, total-goals series to advance to the second round. The second-place Montreal Canadiens and Boston Bruins both advanced to the second round. The Canadiens lost to the first-place Ottawa Senators, while the Bruins upset the first-place New York Rangers to set up the Finals. Ties were not broken using overtime. After two ties in the Finals, NHL president Frank Calder capped the Finals at four games and neither team won three games of the best-of-five Finals. Ottawa won two to Boston's none and the series ended on April 13 with Ottawa the winner.

Playoff bracket

Quarterfinals

(C2) Montreal Canadiens vs. (C3) Montreal Maroons

(A2) Boston Bruins vs. (A3) Chicago Black Hawks

Game one of this series was played in New York.

Semifinals

(C1) Ottawa Senators vs. (C2) Montreal Canadiens

(A1) New York Rangers vs. (A2) Boston Bruins

Stanley Cup Finals

Awards
A new trophy in memory of Georges Vezina, the Vezina Trophy, was donated this year by Montreal Canadiens owners Leo Dandurand, Louis Letourneau and Joseph Cattarinich. It is to be presented to the league's "most valuable goaltender." It is won by his successor with the Canadiens, George Hainsworth.

Player statistics

Scoring leaders
Note: GP = Games played; G = Goals; A = Assists; Pts = Points

Source: NHL.

Leading goaltenders
Note: GP = Games played; Mins = Minutes played; GA = Goals against; SO = Shut outs; GAA = Goals against average

Playoff scoring leaders
Note: GP = Games played; G = Goals; A = Assists; Pts = Points

Coaches

American Division
Boston Bruins: Art Ross
Chicago Black Hawks: Pete Muldoon
Detroit Cougars: Art Duncan and Duke Keats
New York Rangers: Lester Patrick
Pittsburgh Pirates: Odie Cleghorn

Canadian Division
Montreal Canadiens: Cecil Hart
Montreal Maroons: Eddie Gerard
New York Americans: Newsy Lalonde
Ottawa Senators: Dave Gill
Toronto St. Patricks: Charlie Querrie, Mike Rodden and Alex Romeril

Debuts
The following is a list of players of note who played their first NHL game in 1926–27 (listed with their first team, asterisk(*) marks debut in playoffs):
Percy Galbraith, Boston Bruins
Eddie Shore, Boston Bruins
Harry Oliver, Boston Bruins
Duke Keats, Boston Bruins
George Hay, Chicago Black Hawks
Mickey MacKay, Chicago Black Hawks
Dick Irvin, Chicago Black Hawks
Frank Foyston, Detroit Cougars
Jack Walker, Detroit Cougars
Frank Fredrickson, Detroit Cougars
George Hainsworth, Montreal Canadiens
Art Gagne, Montreal Canadiens
Herb Gardiner, Montreal Canadiens
Hap Emms, Montreal Maroons
Red Dutton, Montreal Maroons
Norman Himes, New York Americans
Paul Thompson, New York Rangers
Bill Cook, New York Rangers
Bun Cook, New York Rangers
Murray Murdoch, New York Rangers
Lorne Chabot, New York Rangers
Clarence Abel, New York Rangers
Ching Johnson, New York Rangers
Danny Cox, Toronto St. Patricks
Ace Bailey, Toronto St. Patricks
Butch Keeling, Toronto St. Patricks
Carl Voss, Toronto St. Patricks

Last games
The following is a list of players of note that played their last game in the NHL in 1926–27 (listed with their last team):
Shorty Green, New York Americans
Newsy Lalonde, New York Americans
Jack Adams, Ottawa Senators
Bert Corbeau, Toronto St. Patricks

Transactions

See also
List of Stanley Cup champions
Prairie Hockey League
List of pre-NHL seasons
1926 in sports
1927 in sports

References
 
 
 
 
 
 
 Deceptions and Doublecross: How the NHL Conquered Hockey by Morey Holzman and Joseph Nieforth Dundurn Books

Notes

External links
Hockey Database
NHL.com

 
NHL
NHL